Journal of Faculty of Engineering was the academic publication of the Faculty of Engineering of Tehran University published in  Persian from 1964 until 2010. After 43 volumes, the journal was split into several separate titles at the discretion of the university administration to put emphasis on specialization in scientific disciplines and to reach out to an international audience by switching to publication in English.

External links 
 
 List of volumes

Engineering journals
Persian-language journals
University of Tehran
Publications established in 1964
Publications disestablished in 2010